Quentin James Reynolds (April 11, 1902 – March 17, 1965) was an American journalist and World War II war correspondent. He also played American football for one season in the National Football League (NFL) with the Brooklyn Lions.

Early life and education
Reynolds was born on April 11, 1902, in The Bronx. He attended Manual Training High School in Brooklyn and Brown University. At Brown, he played college football as a tackle and starred as a breaststroker on the swimming team.

Career
As an associate editor at Collier's Weekly from 1933 to 1945, Reynolds averaged 20 articles a year. He also published 25 books, including The Wounded Don't Cry, London Diary, Dress Rehearsal, and Courtroom, a biography of lawyer Samuel Leibowitz. His autobiography was titled By Quentin Reynolds.

After World War II, Reynolds was best known for his 1955 libel suit against right-wing Hearst columnist Westbrook Pegler, who called him "yellow" and an "absentee war correspondent". Reynolds, represented by noted attorney Louis Nizer, won $175,001 (approximately $1.9 million in 2022 dollars), at the time the largest libel judgment ever. The trial was later made into a Broadway play, A Case of Libel, which was twice adapted as TV movies.

In 1953, Reynolds was the victim of a major literary hoax when he published The Man Who Wouldn't Talk, the supposedly true story of a Canadian war hero, George Dupre, who claimed to have been captured and tortured by German soldiers. When the hoax was exposed, Bennett Cerf, of Random House, Reynolds's publisher, reclassified the book as fiction.

On December 8, 1950, Reynolds debuted as a television actor in "The Ponzi Story", an episode of Pulitzer Prize Playhouse. Reynolds was a personal friend of British media mogul Sidney Bernstein. In 1956, Reynolds paid a visit to England to co-host Meet the People, the launch night program for Manchester-based Granada Television (now ITV Granada) which Bernstein founded.

Reynolds was a member of Delta Tau Delta International Fraternity.

Death
Reynolds died of cancer, on March 17, 1965, at Travis Air Force Base Hospital in Fairfield, California.

Books

 Parlor, Bedlam and Bath (with S. J. Perelman), Liveright, 1930
 The Wounded Don't Cry, E P Dutton, 1941
 A London Diary, Angus & Robertson, 1941
 Convoy, Random House, 1942
 Only the Stars are Neutral, Random House, 1942; Blue Ribbon Books, 1943
 Dress Rehearsal: The Story of Dieppe, Random House, 1943
 The Curtain Rises, Random House, 1944
 Officially Dead: The Story of Commander C D Smith, USN; The Prisoner the Japs Couldn’t Hold No. 511 Random House, 1945 (Published by Pyramid Books under the title He Came Back in multiple printings in the 1960s and early 1970s.)
 70,000 to 1 (Seventy Thousand to One); True War Adventure, 1946
 The Wright Brothers, Pioneers of American Aviation, Random House Landmark Books, 1950
 Courtroom; The Story of Samuel S Leibowitz, Farrar, Straus and Co, 1950
 Custer's Last Stand, Random House, 1951
 The Battle of Britain, Random House, 1953
 The Amazing Mr Doolittle; A Biography of Lieutenant General James H Doolittle, Appleton-Century-Crofts, 1953
 The Man Who Wouldn't Talk, 1953
 I, Willie Sutton, Farrar, Straus and Young, 1953
 The FBI, Random House Landmark Books, 1954
 Headquarters, Harper & Brothers, 1955
 The Fiction Factory; or, From Pulp Row to Quality Street; The Story of 100 years of Publishing at Street & Smith, Random House 1955
 They Fought for the Sky; The Dramatic Story of the First War in the Air, Rinehart & Company, 1957
 Minister of Death: The Adolf Eichmann Story (by Zwy Aldouby and Quentin James Reynolds), Viking 1960
 Known But to God; The Story of the “Unknowns” of America’s War Memorials, John Day 1960
 Winston Churchill, Random House 1963
 By Quentin Reynolds, McGraw Hill, 1963
 Britain Can Take It! (based on the film)
 Don't Think It Hasn't Been Fun
 The Life of Saint Patrick
 Macapagal, the Incorruptible
 A Secret for Two
 With Fire and Sword; Great War Adventures

Screenplays
 Call Northside 777 (1948)
 The Miracle of the Bells (1948)

See also

 London Can Take It! (1940), narrated by Reynolds
 Christmas Under Fire (1941), written and narrated by Reynolds
 Nazi Eyes on Canada (1942)
 Reynolds v. Pegler

References

External links

 
 
 

1902 births
1965 deaths
20th-century American journalists
20th-century American non-fiction writers
20th-century American male writers
20th-century American screenwriters
American football guards
American football tackles
American male breaststroke swimmers
American male journalists
American male screenwriters
American military writers
American war correspondents of World War II
Brooklyn Lions players
Brown Bears football players
Brown Bears men's swimmers
Journalists from California
Writers from the Bronx
Writers from Brooklyn
Writers from San Francisco
Screenwriters from New York (state)
Screenwriters from California
Sportspeople from the Bronx
Players of American football from New York City
Sportspeople from Brooklyn
Deaths from cancer in California
Burials at Holy Cross Cemetery, Brooklyn